Kaan Caliskaner (born 3 November 1999) is a German professional footballer who plays as a centre-forward for Jahn Regensburg.

Career
Caliskaner made his professional debut for Jahn Regensburg in the 2020–21 DFB-Pokal on 13 September 2020, starting in the home match against 3. Liga side 1. FC Kaiserslautern.

Personal life
Born in Germany, Caliskaner is of Turkish descent.

References

External links
 
 

1999 births
Living people
German people of Turkish descent
German footballers
Footballers from Cologne
Association football forwards
1. FC Köln II players
SSV Jahn Regensburg players
2. Bundesliga players
Regionalliga players